Boss Horn is an album by American trumpeter Blue Mitchell recorded in 1966 and released on the Blue Note label.

Reception

The Allmusic review by Matt Collar awarded the album 4 stars and stated "Trumpeter Blue Mitchell delivers a solid hard bop date with his 1966 Blue Note release Boss Horn".

Track listing
 "Millie" (Pearson) - 6:18
 "O Mama Enit" (Mitchell) - 5:34
 "I Should Care" (Sammy Cahn, Axel Stordahl, Paul Weston) - 7:31
 "Rigor Mortez" (Dave Burns) - 6:21
 "Tones for Joan's Bones" (Chick Corea) - 6:37
 "Straight Up and Down" (Chick Corea) - 6:36

Personnel
Blue Mitchell – trumpet
Jerry Dodgion – flute, alto saxophone
Junior Cook – tenor saxophone
Pepper Adams – baritone saxophone
Julian Priester – trombone
Chick Corea (5-6), Cedar Walton (1-4) – piano
Gene Taylor – bass
Mickey Roker – drums
Duke Pearson – arrangement

References

Blue Note Records albums
Blue Mitchell albums
1967 albums
Albums recorded at Van Gelder Studio
Albums arranged by Duke Pearson
Albums produced by Alfred Lion